Return of Hip Hop is the first album by hip hop producer DJ Tomekk. It was released on 12 February 2001 through Fila/Modul/BMG. Entirely produced by Tomekk, it features guest appearances from several German hip hop recording artists, including MC Rene, Torch, Afrob, Curse, Die Firma and Stieber Twins, as well as American rappers, such as Coolio, Flavor Flav, GZA, KRS-One and Prodigal Sunn. The album peaked at number 5 in Germany, number 27 in Switzerland and number 49 in Austria. It was supported with three charted singles: "1, 2, 3, ... Rhymes Galore", "Ich lebe für Hip Hop" and "Return of Hip Hop (Ooh, Ooh)".

Track listing 

Notes
The German in the titles translates to:
Track 3 "Legends (Rauch was, trink was...)" - "Legends (Smoke Something, Drink Something...)"
Track 4 "Ich lebe für Hip Hop (Teil 2: Juice Crew Saga 2001)" - "I Live for Hip Hop (Part 2: Juice Crew Saga 2001)"
Track 15 "Kreislauf" - "Cycle"

Charts

References

External links 
 

2001 debut albums
BMG Rights Management albums
Hip hop albums by German artists